The Nikon F75 (sold in the United States as the N75 and Japan as the U2) was the last consumer-level autofocus 35mm SLR camera sold by the Nikon Corporation beginning in 2003. The camera replaced the similarly consumer-targeted Nikon F65.

History and Design
The Nikon F75 was released in February 2003, and is basically a version of the F5 with a plastic frame. The F75 was designed for consumers and professionals working on a budget as it has most of the options of the more advanced F5 at a lower cost, because of the liberal use of plastics in the design. The camera was offered in silver or black, and retailed for only $300 new with a lens, and there were often rebates available. F75s without lenses were also sold for as low as $190. 

The F75's features include depth-of-field preview, illuminated LCDs, full VR, flash, every exposure mode and program shift. The N75 also has new features, such as a 25 segment meter and a battery level indicator in the viewfinder. There was a version, dubbed the F75D (N75D) that featured a date-recording back. The N75 is also completely compatible with every type of Nikon lens dating back to 1983, including the AF, VR, AF-I and AF-S lenses. The F75 also has a metal lens mount in addition to its largely plastic construction. The F75 uses two CR2 lithium batteries.

Despite the advanced design and low cost, the Nikon F75 was released around the time digital cameras became mainstream, and its release was overshadowed by Nikon's more successful DSLRs, the Nikon D100 and D70. It was discontinued in January 2006, but it is still sold cheaply on the used market, and is valued because it can drive Nikon's newest lens designs.

Gallery

References

External links

N75 at Nikon-image.com

F075
F075